Adel Kolahkaj (born February 21, 1985) is a retired Iranian footballer who last played for Esteghlal Khozestan and Perspolis among other clubs in Persian Gulf Pro League.

Club career
He started his career in Foolad and won the league with the team and played in the 2006 AFC Champions League group stage. He moved to Saba after Foolad got relegated. He joined Sepahan in summer 2012. On 20 September 2012, Adel narrowly avoided injury when he picked up a small explosive device which had been thrown on the pitch during a match against Al-Ahli. He moved to Persepolis in June 2009. He joined Persepolis in December 2012. He signed a 2.5 year contract until end of 2015–16 season. On 28 May 2013, Persepolis coach Ali Daei did not let him train with the team and wanted him to join to another team. He joined Esteghlal Khuzestan on 1 July 2013, signed a one-year contract.

Club career statistics

 Assist goals

International career
He is a member of Iran national under-23 football team. participating in the 2006 Asian Games. In October 2006,  He is known for taking free kicks, such as the one he scored against Saudi Arabia in Iran's 2-3 away match defeat.

Honours

Iran Pro League
Winner: 1
2004–05 with Foolad
Hazfi Cup
Winner: 1
2009–10 with Persepolis
Runner-up: 1
2012–13 with Persepolis

National 
Iran U23

 Asian Games Bronze Medal: 2006

References
1.Esteghlal  vs. Perspolis Soccerway. Retrieved 2 October 2009.

2. Sepahan vs. Perspolis Soccerway. Retrieved 23 September 2012.

3. Esteghlal Khozestan vs. Naft Tehran Soccerway. Retrieved 23 September 2018.

4. Al Hilal vs. Saba Qom Soccerway. Retrieved 11 March 2009.

1985 births
Living people
Iranian footballers
Association football midfielders
Persian Gulf Pro League players
Foolad FC players
Saba players
Persepolis F.C. players
Sanat Mes Kerman F.C. players
Esteghlal Khuzestan players
Asian Games bronze medalists for Iran
Iran under-20 international footballers
Asian Games medalists in football
Footballers at the 2006 Asian Games
Medalists at the 2006 Asian Games

External links 

 Adel Kolahkaj at PersianLeague.com
 Adel Kolahkaj at Soccerway
 Adel Kolahkaj on Instagram
 Adel Kolahkaj at metafootball